A One Day International (ODI) is an international cricket match between two representative teams, each having ODI status, as determined by the International Cricket Council (ICC). An ODI differs from Test matches in that the number of overs per team is limited, and that each team has only one innings.

India played their first ODI in 1974 and a total of 250 players have represented the team. Since 1974 India has played 1,026 ODIs, resulting in 538 victories, 436 defeats, 9 ties and 43 no results. India registered their first series victory against England in a 3-match series by 2–1 in 1981. India won the Cricket World Cup twice in 1983 and 2011 and was runner-up in 2003. India won the ICC Champions Trophy in the year 2013 and had earlier shared once with Sri Lanka in 2002 because rain washed out the attempt to complete the final twice. India was also runner-up in 2000. India have won the Asia Cup (in ODI format) a total of six times in 1984, 1988, 1990, 1995, 2010 and 2018.

Sachin Tendulkar is the youngest debutant at the age of 16 years and 238 days and Farokh Engineer is the oldest debutant at the age of 36 years and 138 days. Anil Kumble is the leading wicket taker with 337 wickets to his name, and Sachin Tendulkar is the leading run scorer with 18,426 runs to his name from 452 innings at an average of 44.83. Tendulkar holds the record for playing the most ODI matches played (463). He also holds the world record number of Man of the Match awards. Rohit Sharma's score of 264 against Sri Lanka in November 2014 is the highest number of runs scored by any player in an ODI. Sourav Ganguly's 183 against Sri Lanka is the highest number of runs scored by an Indian Cricketer in a Cricket World Cup match.

Key

Players
The list is arranged in the order in which each player won his first ODI cap. Where more than one player won his first ODI cap in the same match, those players are listed alphabetically by last name at the time of debut. The statistics in this table only include ODI matches played for India (some players have also played for the Asia XI or World XI).

Statistics are correct as of 24 January 2023.

Notes:
1 Anil Kumble, Sourav Ganguly, Harbhajan Singh, Zaheer Khan, Yuvraj Singh, Ashish Nehra and Mahendra Singh Dhoni also played ODI cricket for ACC Asian XI. Only their records for India are given above.
2 Rahul Dravid and Virender Sehwag have played ODI cricket for both the ICC World XI and the ACC Asian XI. Only their records for India are given above.

Captains

A total of 26 players have captained the Indian ODI team.

See also

List of India test cricketers
List of India Twenty20 International cricketers
ICC ODI Championship
List of cricket terms
History of cricket

Notes

References

External links
Howstat
Cricinfo
International Cricket Council

India ODI
India